Little Thornapple River is a  river in Barry County in the U.S. state of Michigan.

The Little Thornapple, with Jordan Lake tributaries, forms an important part of the upper Coldwater River watershed. The Little Thornapple is considered to form the headwaters of the Coldwater River.

Lake Jordan is fed primarily by the outflow of Tupper Lake, which in turn is fed by Tupper Creek all in Odessa and Sebewa townships in Ionia County.

References 

Rivers of Michigan
Rivers of Barry County, Michigan
Tributaries of Lake Michigan